The trochilus or trochilos (Greek: τροχίλος, trokhílos = "runner"), sometimes called the crocodile bird, is a legendary bird, first described by Herodotus, and later by Aristotle, Pliny, and Aelian, which was supposed to have enjoyed a symbiotic relationship with the Nile crocodile: it was said to pick leeches from the crocodile's throat by Herodotus, and to pick the crocodile's teeth by Aristotle. The trochilus has subsequently been spuriously identified with several bird species endemic to the Nile valley.

Ancient sources

Herodotus 
According to the Histories of Herodotus, the Egyptian crocodiles bask on the shore with their mouths open and a bird called a "trochilus" flies into their open mouths so as to feed on the leeches which, because of the crocodiles' aquatic habitat, live there in abundance:

Aristotle 
In the course of his biological researches, Aristotle classifies the trochilus among the water-birds in his History of Animals. Aristotle records the same pattern of cleaning symbiosis reported by Herodotus, but differs as to its purpose, stating that "when the crocodile gapes, the trochilus flies into its mouth, to cleanse its teeth", presumably to feed on decaying meat lodged between the teeth and gums.

Pliny 
The story is further elaborated by Pliny the Elder in his Natural History in connection with the tale of the ichneumon.

Aelian 
AeIian in his On the Nature of Animals says that Ieeches invade the mouth of the crocodile, as it swims with it open, and cause the animal much discomfort; feeling the need of the trochiIus as "doctor", it swims to the bank and lies there with its jaws agape, whereupon the bird enters and removes the leeches, while the crocodile remains perfectly still so as not to harm it. Aelian also acknowledges the existence of several types of trochilus other than the crocodile bird.

Modern theories 

The story that the trochilus cleans the mouth of the crocodile is considered a fable, but many travellers and naturalists have been reluctant to reject it, and there have been attempts to identify the trochilus with several species of plover, lapwing and sandpiper, and to explain its curious behaviour. Leo Africanus mentions the story uncritically in his Description of Africa. Topsell says that the crocodile reopens its mouth because the bird carries sharp thorns on its head which prick the crocodile's palate, and Leith Adams says that the reminder is conveyed to the crocodile by the horny spurs of the bird, which Brehm identified as the Egyptian plover.

In 1895 Henry Scherren quoted John Mason Cook, son of travel agent Thomas Cook, as reporting from Egypt that he had seen some spur-winged plovers approach a crocodile, which opened its jaws for them:

The eleventh edition of the Encyclopædia Britannica says that this bird picks parasites from the teeth and hide of the crocodile and supposes a connection with the spurwing and the plover. The English adventurer Major Chaplin Court Treatt made the following statement in 1931 based on his travels in Africa:

Scepticism 
More recent research has not confirmed these observations, and there is no reliable evidence that this or any other species in fact has such a relationship with the crocodile. The written accounts are considered suspect by the biologist Thomas Howell. However, Cott records that spur-winged plovers are the birds that most often feed around basking crocodiles, and are tolerated by them. MacFarland and Reeder, reviewing the evidence in 1974, found that:

Proposed species 

 Sandpiper
 Egyptian plover
 Spur-winged lapwing
 White-crowned lapwing

Literary references 

 John Pory's 1600 translation of Leo Africanus, A Geographical History of Africa, inspired a passage spoken by Flamineo in Webster's 1612 tragedy The White Devil (IV, ii, 224–235). The relationship between the crocodile and the little bird trochilus was frequently used by Elizabethans to symbolise ingratitude.
 Thomas Lovell Beddoes' sonnet "A Crocodile", published posthumously in 1851, follows the account of Herodotus.

See also 

 Cleaning symbiosis
 Commensalism
 Mutualism
 Ichneumon
 List of birds of Egypt
 Streamertail
 Willow warbler

References

Bibliography

Ancient sources 

 Arnott, Geoffrey W. (2007). Birds in the Ancient World from A to Z. London: Routledge.
 Bostock, John (1855). The Natural History of Pliny. Vol. 2. London: Henry G. Bohn.
 Cresswell, Richard (1887). Aristotle's History of Animals. London: George Bell & Sons.
 Liddell, Henry George; Scott, Robert (1940) "τροχίλος, ὁ, (τρέχω)". A Greek–English Lexicon. Oxford: Clarendon Press.
 Rawlinson, George (1910). The History of Herodotus. London: J. M. Dent & Sons.
 Scholfield, A. F. (1958). Aelian: On the Characteristics of Animals. Vol. 1. London: Heinemann.

Modern sources 

 Adams, Andrew Leith (January 1864). "Notes and Observations on the Birds of Egypt and Nubia". The Ibis 6(21): 1–36.
 Anderson, John (1898). Zoology of Egypt. Vol. 1: Reptilia and Batrachia. London: Bernard Quaritch. pp. 18–22.
 Breiner, Laurence A. (March 1979). "The Career of the Cockatrice". Isis 70(1): 30–47.
 Canfield, Michael R. (2015). Theodore Roosevelt in the Field. London: University of Chicago Press.
 Cott, Hugh B. (1961). "Scientific results of an inquiry into the ecology and economic status of the Nile Crocodile (Crocodilus niloticus) in Uganda and Northern Rhodesia". Transactions of the Zoological Society of London, 29(4): 211–356.
 Court Treatt, Chaplin (1931). Out of the Beaten Track: a Narrative of Travel in Little Known Africa. New York: E. P. Dutton & Co.
 Crawfurd, Raymond (January 1919). "Legends and Lore of the Healing Art: II". The Lotus Magazine 10(1): 25–30.
 Howell, Thomas R. (1979). Breeding Biology of the Egyptian Plover, Pluvianus aegyptius. Berkeley: University of California Press.
 Jones, Eldred D. (1962). "African figures in the Elizabethan and Jacobean drama", Durham E-Theses Online, Durham University.
 MacFarland, Craig G.; Reeder, W. G. (1974). "Cleaning symbiosis involving Galapagos tortoises and two species of Darwin's finches". Zeitschrift für Tierpsychologie. 34(5): 464–483.
 Malkiel, David (January 2016). "The Rabbi and the Crocodile: Interrogating Nature in the Late Quattrocento". Speculum 91(1): 115–148.
 McCartney, Eugene S. (January 1943). "Review: [Untitled]". The Classical Journal 83(4): 230–232.
 Métraux, Alexandre (February 2016). "On Some Issues of Human-Animal Studies: An Introduction". Science in Context. 29(1): 1–10.
 
 Scherren, Henry (1895). Popular History of Animals for Young People. Philadelphia: J. B. Lippincott Co.; London: Cassell & Co., Ltd.

Further reading 

 Beddoes, Thomas Lovell (1851). The Poems, Posthumous and Collected. Vol. 1. ["A Crocodile"]. London: William Pickering. pp. 108–109.
 Lucas, F. L. (1927). The Complete Works of John Webster. Vol. 1. ["The White Devil"]. London: Chatto & Windus. p. 159.
 Pory, John (1600). A Geographical Historie of Africa [by Leo Africanus]. ["Of the Crocodile"]. London: [Printed by Eliot's Court Press]. pp. 345–346.

Legendary birds